Muhammad Firdaus bin Saiyadi (born 22 October 1996) is a Malaysian footballer who plays as a winger for Malaysia Super League club Kuala Lumpur City on loan from Perak.

Firdaus made his senior debut after being promoted from the youth team in 2016. He has made 10 appearances in Malaysia Super League during his senior debut with Perak FC.

In 2014, while playing for the youth team, he was sent to Australia to train with Newcastle Jets for 9 days.

Career statistics

Club

Honours

Perak
 Malaysia Cup: 2018
 Malaysia Super League runner-up: 2018
 Malaysia FA Cup runner-up: 2019

References

External links
 

1996 births
Living people
Malaysian people of Malay descent
People from Perak
Malaysian footballers
Malaysia international footballers
Perak F.C. players
Kuala Lumpur City F.C. players
Association football midfielders
Association football wingers